The  is the sole transport squadron of the 3rd Tactical Airlift Group of the Japan Air Self-Defense Force based at Miho Air Base in Tottori Prefecture, Japan. It is equipped with Kawasaki C-1 and Kawasaki C-2 aircraft.

History
The squadron retired its last NAMC YS-11P aircraft in May 2017 after nearly 30 years of operations. YS-11P 52-1152 is exhibited in the Aichi Museum of Flight.

In November 2017 a Kawasaki C-2 of the squadron deployed to the Japan Self-Defense Force Base Djibouti in Africa for the first time.

Tail marking

The squadron's tail markings show the story of the Hare of Inaba.

Aircraft operated

 NAMC YS-11P (1978–2017)
 Kawasaki C-1 (1979–2018)
 Kawasaki C-2 (2017–present)

References

Units of the Japan Air Self-Defense Force